The Five O'Clock News may refer to:

Canada
CTV News at 5 (Maritimes) (2012-present)

Ireland
 TV3 News at 5.30 (2001-present)

UK
 BBC News at Five (2006-present)
 ITV News at 5:30 (1988-2012)
 Live at Five (Sky News programme)
 5 News (1997-present)

See also
 One O'Clock News (disambiguation)
 Six O'Clock News (disambiguation)
 Nine O'Clock News (disambiguation)
 News at Ten (disambiguation)